The Reverse-wing Pouter is a breed of fancy pigeon developed over many years of selective breeding. Reverse-wing Pouters, along with other varieties of domesticated pigeons, are all descendants from the rock pigeon (Columba livia).
The breed is known for its eye-catching markings.

Origin
The breed originated in Saxony and Thuringia in the early 19th century.

See also 

List of pigeon breeds

References

Pigeon breeds
Pigeon breeds originating in Germany